Millfield Arts Centre comprises Millfield Theatre and Millfield House in Edmonton and The Dugdale Centre in Enfield Town.

It is owned by London Borough of Enfield Council.

External links
 Millfield Arts Centre - official site

Buildings and structures in the London Borough of Enfield
Arts centres in London
Tourist attractions in the London Borough of Enfield
Enfield, London
Edmonton, London